Bodily Functions is a studio album by British electronic musician Herbert. It was released by !K7 Records in 2001.

Critical reception 

John Bush of AllMusic praised Bodily Functions as "the perfect marriage of art and intelligence". Sal Cinquemani of Slant Magazine said: "Often jazzy, often housey and sometimes folky, the album rarely misses a beat in any of its assumed genres." PopMatters writer Kevin Strychalski called the album Herbert's "Mona Lisa", writing that "never before has an artist working within the electronic medium delivered an album of such depth and maturity." Slant Magazine named Bodily Functions the third best album of 2001.

Pitchfork placed Bodily Functions at number 173 on its list of the top 200 albums of the 2000s. Bodily Functions was also named the 16th best album of the decade by Resident Advisor.

Track listing

Personnel 
Credits adapted from liner notes.
 Matthew Herbert – production, piano, Rhodes piano, violin, bass guitar
 Dani Siciliano – vocals, clarinet
 Luca Santucci – vocals
 Shingai Shoniwa – vocals
 Peter Wraight – bass clarinet, flugelhorn, flute, trumpet
 John Matthias – violin
 Phil Parnell – piano
 Jim Mullen – guitar
 Dave Green – double bass
 Paul Clarvis – drums

References

External links 
 

2001 albums
Matthew Herbert albums
Studio !K7 albums